Clayton Valli (May 25, 1951 – March 7, 2003) was an American prominent deaf linguist and American Sign Language (ASL) poet whose work helped further to legitimize ASL and introduce people to the richness of American Sign Language literature.

Personal life
Born in Newburyport, Massachusetts, Valli attended the Austine School for the Deaf in Vermont. He earned an A.A.S. in photography from the National Technical Institute for the Deaf at the Rochester Institute of Technology and a B.A. from  the University of Nevada, Reno in social psychology. In 1985, he received his M.A. in linguistics from Gallaudet University. His Ph.D. in linguistics and ASL poetics from the Union Institute in Cincinnati, Ohio, which he received in 1993 made him the first person ever to achieve a doctorate in ASL poetry. He was also the first individual to identify the features of ASL poetry as a literary genre in its own right.

Career
As a poet, Valli created original works in ASL that he performed to appreciative audiences around the US. His poems make sophisticated use of handshape, movement, use of space, repetition and facial expression. Influenced by canonical American poets like Robert Frost, as well as deaf poets such as Bernard Bragg, Valli often chose nature imagery to convey subtle insights into deaf experience. His brief "Hands" — which makes use of the 5 handshape throughout — is a celebration of the power of sign language to describe anything in the universe. "Dandelion" uses simple nature imagery to convey the persistence of ASL despite oralists' best efforts to weed it out.
 
He gave workshops and presentations across the US that raised awareness and appreciation for the movement, meter and rhythm in ASL poetry. His own poetic works, which have drawn international recognition for their aestheticism and contribution to literary scholarship, are available on video, performed both by him and by other ASL artists.

Valli taught in the Linguistics Department at Gallaudet University. He researched the sociolinguistics of ASL, co-authoring such influential books as Introduction to the Linguistics of American Sign Language and The Gallaudet Dictionary of American Sign Language and numerous articles.

He also made an impact in Canada, working at the Ernest C. Drury School for the Deaf in Milton, Ontario. He provided teacher training workshops in ASL poetry for the Ontario ASL Curriculum Team. He helped to pioneer the worldwide movement to develop an ASL-as-a-first-language curriculum for deaf children.

Valli died from complications of AIDS. Two scholarship funds are named in his memory at Gallaudet University.

See also
Bimodal bilingualism
American Sign Language literature

References

Deaf poets
Linguists from the United States
Rochester Institute of Technology alumni
University of Nevada, Reno alumni
Gallaudet University alumni
Union Institute & University alumni
20th-century poets
American deaf people
1951 births
2003 deaths
AIDS-related deaths in Massachusetts
20th-century linguists